Liang Soon Hin (born 13 February 1944) is a Malaysian wrestler. He competed in the men's freestyle flyweight at the 1964 Summer Olympics.

References

External links
 

1944 births
Living people
Malaysian male sport wrestlers
Olympic wrestlers of Malaysia
Wrestlers at the 1964 Summer Olympics
Place of birth missing (living people)